The Soyama Dam is a gravity dam on the Shō River in Soyama village about  southeast of Nanto in Toyama Prefecture, Japan. It was constructed between 1927 and 1930. The dam has an associated 128.1 MW hydroelectric power station which was built in two parts. The first part of the power station (56.1 MW) was commissioned in 1930 and the second part of the power station (72 MW) was commissioned in 1967. Of the nine dams on the Shō River it is the third furthest downstream.

See also

Komaki Dam – downstream
Ohara Dam – upstream

References

Dams in Toyama Prefecture
Gravity dams
Dams completed in 1930
Dams on the Shō River
Hydroelectric power stations in Japan